Flávio Silva Cristóvão (born 23 May 1997) is a Portuguese footballer who plays as a midfielder for Cypriot club PO Xylotymbou.

Career
Cristóvão, the son of former Portuguese international Hélder, joined English Premier League club Wolverhampton Wanderers on 31 July 2019 after impressing on trial in order to join up with the club's under-23 group.  He made his first team debut for Wolves on 30 October in an EFL Cup 2–1 loss at Aston Villa, replacing compatriot Pedro Neto for the last 13 minutes.

On 31 January 2020, he left Wolves to sign for Austrian club Juniors OÖ, where he spent the remainder of the 2019–20 season without making any first team appearances, before returning to his homeland to sign for C.S. Marítimo B in August 2020.

References

External links

Career statistics at ForaDeJogo

1997 births
Living people
Portuguese footballers
Portuguese expatriate footballers
People from Chaves, Portugal
Association football midfielders
Sportspeople from Vila Real District
Casa Pia A.C. players
SC Mirandela players
C.D. Aves players
Wolverhampton Wanderers F.C. players
FC Juniors OÖ players
F.C. Alverca players
SC São João de Ver players
S.U. Sintrense players
P.O. Xylotymbou players
Campeonato de Portugal (league) players
Portuguese expatriate sportspeople in England
Portuguese expatriate sportspeople in Austria
Portuguese expatriate sportspeople in Cyprus
Expatriate footballers in England
Expatriate footballers in Austria
Expatriate footballers in Cyprus